Uplift Community High School (commonly known as simply Uplift) is a public four–year high school located in the Uptown neighborhood on the north side of Chicago, Illinois, United States. Established in 2005, Uplift is a part of the Chicago Public Schools system. As of the 2019–2020 school year, the school has 121 students.

Athletics
Uplift competes in the Chicago Public League (CPL) and is a member of the Illinois High School Association (IHSA). Uplift sports teams are nicknamed the Titans. The boys' basketball team were regional champions two times, (2008–09, 2010–11); and won the IHSA 2–A state title in 2014–15 behind the schools stars Jeremey Roscoe and Daniel Soetan and a Northside Prep transfer Spencer Foley while Junior Varsity sensation Demarius Jacobs enjoyed some playing time as well

References

Educational institutions established in 1999
1999 establishments in Illinois
Public high schools in Chicago